Donadinia is a genus of fungi in the family Sarcosomataceae. It contains the species Donadinia sibirica from Russia, and Donadinia seaveri, found in Bermuda.

References

External links

Pezizales genera
Pezizales